Fritz Schachermeyr (1895 – 1987, also Schachermeyer) was an Austrian historian, professor at the University of Vienna from 1952 until retirement.
 
Schachermeyr was born in Linz, and studied in Graz, Berlin and Innsbruck. At Innsbruck, he was a reader in ancient history from 1928 to 1931. He acted as professor in Jena (1931), Heidelberg (1936) and Graz (1940). In 1952, he was called to Vienna University as professor of Greek history, ancient history and epigraphy.
 
Schachermeyr was a fervent supporter of Nazism during the Third Reich, advocating a "racial-biological view of world history" or a "biology of history". He disowned his racist screeds only after 1945 when they had gone completely out of public favor.

Publications

 Etruskische Frühgeschichte, Berlin, Leipzig 1929
 Zur Rasse und Kultur im minoischen Kreta, Carl Winter, Heidelberg 1939
 Lebensgesetzlichkeit in der Geschichte. Versuch einer Einführung in das geschichtsbiologische Denken, Klostermann, Frankfurt/M. 1940
 Indogermanen und Orient. Ihre kulturelle und machpolitische Auseinandersetzung im Altertum, Stuttgart 1944
 Alexander, der Grosse. Ingenium und Macht, Pustet, Graz–Salzburg–Wien 1949
 Alexander der Grosse. Das Problem seiner Persönlichkeit und seines Wirkens, Wien 1973 
 Griechische Geschichte. Mit besonderer Berücksichtigung der geistesgeschichtlichen und kulturmorphologischen Zusammenhänge, Kohlhammer Verlag, Stuttgart 1960
 Perikles, Kohlhammer Verlag, Stuttgart–Berlin–Köln–Mainz 1969
 Geistesgeschichte der Perikleischen Zeit, Stuttgart–Berlin–Köln–Mainz 1971
 Die Tragik der Voll-Endung. Stirb und Werde in der Vergangenheit. Europa im Würgegriff der Gegenwart, Koska, Wien–Berlin 1981
 Ein Leben zwischen Wissenschaft und Kunst, edd. Gerhard Dobesch, Hilde Schachermeyr, Wien, Köln, Graz 1984

Decorations and awards
 1957: Full member of the Austrian Academy of Sciences
 Corresponding member of the Heidelberg Academy of Sciences
 Honorary doctorates from the Universities of Athens (1961) and Vienna (1984)
 Austrian Cross of Honour for Science and Art, 1st class
 Austrian Decoration for Science and Art
 Great Gold Medal with Star for Services to the Republic of Austria
 Honorary Medal of Vienna in gold
 Medal for Merit for science from Linz
 1963: he was awarded the Wilhelm Hartel Prize

See also
Hans F. K. Günther
Nazi eugenics

References

Martina Pesditschek, "Die Karriere des Althistorikers Fritz Schachermayr im Dritten Reich und in der Zweiten Republik". in: Mensch · Wissenschaft · Magie, Mitteilungen der Österreichischen Gesellschaft für Wissenschaftsgeschichte 25  (2005), 41-72.
Ursula Minder, Werner Sauer, 'Akademischer Rassismus in Graz - Materialien zur Wissenschaftsgeschichte der Grazer Universität', in: NS-Wissenschaft als Vernichtungsinstrument : Rassenhygiene, Zwangssterilisation, Menschenversuche und NS-Euthanasie in der Steiermark,  Wolfgang Freidl, Werner Sauer (eds.), Vienna, Facultas (2004), pp. 113 –138.
Hans-Christian Harten, Uwe Neirich, Matthias Schwerendt, Rassenhygiene als Erziehungsideologie des  Dritten Reichs: Bio-bibliographisches Handbuch, Akademie Verlag (2006), p. 77.

External links
http://www.wien.gv.at/rk/historisch/1965/jaenner.html 

1895 births
1987 deaths
Writers from Linz
20th-century Austrian historians
Proponents of scientific racism
Nazi eugenics
Austrian Nazis
Academic staff of the University of Vienna
Members of the Austrian Academy of Sciences
Recipients of the Austrian Decoration for Science and Art
Recipients of the Grand Decoration with Star for Services to the Republic of Austria